The 2019–20 season was Real Madrid's 89th in existence, their 64th consecutive season in the top flight of Spanish basketball and 13th consecutive season in the EuroLeague. This was also the ninth season in a row under head coach Pablo Laso.

Times up to 26 October 2019 and from 29 March 2020 were CEST (UTC+2). Times from 27 October 2019 to 28 March 2020 were CET (UTC+1).

Players

Squad information

Depth chart

Transactions

In

|}

Out

|}

Pre-season and friendlies

Torneo Costa del Sol

Torneo Liberbank Ciudad de Oviedo

Trofeo Ibercaja Ciudad de Zaragoza

Competitions

Overview

Liga ACB

League table

Results summary

Results by round

Matches

Playoffs

Group stage

EuroLeague

League table

Results summary

Results by round

Matches

Copa del Rey

Quarterfinals

Semifinals

Final

Supercopa de España

Semifinals

Final

Statistics

Liga ACB

Source: ACB

EuroLeague

Source: EuroLeague

Copa del Rey

Source: ACB

Supercopa de España

Source: ACB

Notes

References

External links
 

 
Real Madrid
Real Madrid